Glorious Times at the Spessart Inn is a 1967 West German comedy film directed by Kurt Hoffmann and starring Liselotte Pulver, Harald Leipnitz, and Vivi Bach.

It is the last in a trilogy of films begun by The Spessart Inn in 1958. The plot this time revolves around time travelling.

The film's sets were designed by the art directors Isabella and Werner Schlichting. It was shot at the Spandau Studios in Berlin and on location in Bavaria, Hesse and Vienna.

Cast

References

Bibliography

External links 
 

1960s science fiction comedy films
1967 films
1967 comedy films
German ghost films
German science fiction comedy films
West German films
1960s German-language films
Films directed by Kurt Hoffmann
German sequel films
1960s ghost films
Films about time travel
Constantin Film films
Films shot at Spandau Studios
1960s German films